The Bay Area Sports Hall of Fame honors sports figures who have made a significant impact in the San Francisco Bay Area. The organization is a section 501(c)(3) nonprofit that was created by the San Francisco Chamber of Commerce in 1979. It is located on Montgomery Street in San Francisco.

Inductees

Class of 2021
Bruce Bochy
Rickey Henderson
Bryant Young
Natalie Coughlin
Paul Cayard

Notes

References

External links
Bay Area Sports Hall of Fame

Sports in the San Francisco Bay Area
Halls of fame in California
All-sports halls of fame
Sports organizations established in 1979
Non-profit organizations based in the San Francisco Bay Area
1979 establishments in California